Kendra Lilly (born June 18, 1991) is a Canadian curler from Sudbury, Ontario. She is a three-time Northern Ontario junior champion skip. She is also the former skip of the Laurentian University women's curling team.

Career
Lilly won the 2009, 2010, 2011 and 2012 Northern Ontario Junior Curling Championships. This qualified her for the Canadian Junior Curling Championships in each of those years. At the 2009 Canadian Junior Curling Championships, she threw fourth rocks for skip Vanessa Maloney and finished with a 6–6 record. At the 2010 Canadian Junior Curling Championships, she skipped the rink of Kim Curtin, Jennifer Gates and Kaitlynd Burns to a 9–3 round robin record. The team then lost to British Columbia's Dailene Sivertson in the semi-final to finish third overall. At the 2011 Canadian Junior Curling Championships, Lilly's team of Gates, Courtney Chenier and Curtin went 6–6 and missed the playoffs. At the 2012 Canadian Junior Curling Championships, her team of Crystal Lillico, Chenier and Avery Thomas went 6–6 again, missing the playoffs. Lilly was also the skip of the Laurentian University curling team.

Following her junior career, Lilly formed a women's team with Chenier, Laura Pickering-Forget and Joanne Comé-Forget. Lilly went 4–5 with this team at her first provincial championship in 2013.

Lilly served as the alternate for the Tracy Horgan rink at the 2013 Olympic Pre-Trials. The team narrowly missed the playoffs, losing the 'C' final qualifier, finishing with a 4–3 record.

Lilly and her team qualified for playoffs at the 2014 Ontario Scotties Tournament of Hearts, losing in the 3 vs. 4 page playoff game.

In 2014, Lilly joined the World Curling Tour for her first season with new teammates Sarah Potts, Oye-Sem Won Briand and Tirzah Keffer. This team played in the inaugural Northern Ontario Scotties Tournament of Hearts in 2015, where she lost to Horgan in the final.

In 2015, Lilly joined the Krista McCarville rink as third, and won a silver medal at the 2016 Scotties Tournament of Hearts for Northern Ontario. They also played in the 2017 Canadian Olympic Curling Trials, finishing 4–4.

In 2018, Lilly substituted at third for Team Rocque (skipped by Laura Crocker) at the Players' Championship. The team lost 8–3 in a tiebreaker to Satsuki Fujisawa.

Team McCarville won the 2019 Northern Ontario Scotties Tournament of Hearts, sending the team once again to represent Northern Ontario at the Scotties. At the 2019 Scotties Tournament of Hearts, the rink had a 8–3 record, putting her team in fourth place in the round robin, earning them a spot in the playoffs. In the 3 vs. 4 game, team McCarville lost to Team Ontario's Rachel Homan rink. The team won the championship again the following year at the 2020 Northern Ontario Scotties Tournament of Hearts, which qualified them for the 2020 Scotties Tournament of Hearts in Moose Jaw, Saskatchewan. Team McCarville lost the 3 vs. 4 game to Ontario and Homan for the second year in a row.

The 2021 Northern Ontario provincial playdowns were cancelled due to the COVID-19 pandemic in Ontario. As the 2020 provincial champions, Lilly, with McCarville's team, was given an automatic invitation to represent Northern Ontario at the 2021 Scotties Tournament of Hearts in Calgary. However, the team declined the invitation, citing family and work priorities.

Team McCarville had enough points to qualify for the 2021 Canadian Olympic Curling Pre-Trials. There, they went 5–1 through the round robin, qualifying for the playoffs. The team had two impressive come-from-behind wins in their two playoff games. In their first game against the Mackenzie Zacharias rink, they were down 7–3 heading into the tenth end, but scored four points, then stole a point in the extra end to win the match. In their second game against Jacqueline Harrison, the team gave up five points in the second end to trail 5–1, but rallied back to win the game 9–6. With the win, they qualified for the 2021 Canadian Olympic Curling Trials, held November 20 to 28 in Saskatoon, Saskatchewan. At the Trials, the team went through the round robin with a 4–4 record. This earned them a spot in the second tiebreaker where they defeated Kerri Einarson 4–3. In the semifinal, they lost 8–3 to Jennifer Jones, eliminating them from contention. The 2022 Northern Ontario Scotties Tournament of Hearts was cancelled due to the pandemic and Team McCarville were selected to represent their province at the national women's championship. At the 2022 Scotties Tournament of Hearts, the team went 5–3 through the round robin, enough to qualify for the playoffs. The team then won both of their seeding round games and defeated New Brunswick's Andrea Crawford in the 1 vs. 2 page playoff game to qualify for the final where they faced the Einarson rink. There, they could not keep their momentum going, losing the Scotties final 9–6. They wrapped up their season at the 2022 Players' Championship where they missed the playoffs.

Personal life
Lilly is employed an operations manager at DKB Financial Services Group Inc. Her brother is curler Evan Lilly.

References

Laurentian University profile
"Local Curlers Show Well on National Stage" - Sudbury Star

External links

1991 births
Canadian women curlers
Curlers from Northern Ontario
Living people
Sportspeople from Greater Sudbury